Conus norai is a species of sea snail, a marine gastropod mollusk, in the family Conidae, the cone snails and their allies.

Distribution
This marine species occurs off Guadeloupe.

References

 Rabiller M. & Richard G. (2019). Conidae offshore de Guadeloupe : Description du matériel dragué lors de l'expédition KARUBENTHOS 2 contenant de nouvelles espèces. Xenophora Taxonomy. 24: 3-31.

External links
 Tucker J.K. (2010) Danker L. N. Vink's The Conidae of the Western Atlantic. The Cone Collector 14A: 1-166

norae